is the third-largest island of Japan's five main islands and the most southerly of the four largest islands (i.e. excluding Okinawa). The historical regional name  referred to Kyushu and its surrounding islands.

In the 8th-century Taihō Code reforms, Dazaifu was established as a special administrative term for the region.

Geography

There are many other signs of tectonic activity, including numerous areas of hot springs. The most famous of these are in Beppu, on the east shore, and around Mt. Aso in central Kyushu. The island is separated from Honshu by the Kanmon Straits. Being the nearest island to the Asian continent, historically it is the gateway to Japan.

It's slightly larger than Taiwan island .

The name Kyūshū comes from the nine ancient provinces of Saikaidō situated on the island: Chikuzen, Chikugo, Hizen, Higo, Buzen, Bungo, Hyūga, Osumi, and Satsuma.

Today's  is a politically defined region that consists of the seven prefectures on the island of Kyushu (which also includes the former Tsushima and Iki as part of Nagasaki), plus Okinawa Prefecture to the south:

 Northern Kyushu
 Fukuoka Prefecture
 Kumamoto Prefecture
 Nagasaki Prefecture
 Ōita Prefecture
 Saga Prefecture
 Southern Kyushu
 Kagoshima Prefecture
 Miyazaki Prefecture
Okinawa
 Okinawa Prefecture

Population

Kyushu has 10.3percent of the population of Japan. Most of Kyushu's population is concentrated along the northwest, in the cities of Fukuoka and Kitakyushu, with population corridors stretching southwest into Sasebo and Nagasaki and south into Kumamoto and Kagoshima. Except for Oita and Miyazaki, the eastern seaboard shows a general decline in population.

Politically, Kyushu is described as a stronghold of the Liberal Democratic Party.

Per Japanese census data, the Kyushu region's population with Ryukyu Islands (Okinawa and Kagoshima Prefectures) has experienced a large population decline since around 2000. However, the population decline is mild mainly due to relatively high birth rate of Ryukyuans both within the Ryukyuan lands (Okinawa and Kagoshima) and throughout the Kyushu region. In addition, the other prefectures in Kyushu also have exceptionally high TFRs compared to the rest of Japan. The Ryukyuans are an indigenous minority group in Japan.

Designated cities
 Fukuoka (population: 1,588,924)
 Kitakyushu (population: 940,978)
 Kumamoto (population: 738,907)

Core cities
 Kagoshima
 Ōita
 Nagasaki
 Miyazaki
 Naha
 Kurume
 Sasebo
 Saga

Environment and agriculture

Parts of Kyushu have a subtropical climate, particularly Miyazaki prefecture and Kagoshima prefecture. Major agricultural products are rice, tea, tobacco, sweet potatoes, and soy; also, silk is widely produced.

Besides the volcanic area of the south, there are significant mud hot springs in the northern part of the island, around Beppu. The springs are the site of occurrence of certain extremophile microorganisms, which are capable of surviving in extremely hot environments.

Economy 

Kyushu  is noted for various types of porcelain, including Arita, Imari, Satsuma, and Karatsu. Heavy industry is concentrated in the north around Fukuoka, Kitakyushu, Nagasaki, and Oita and includes chemicals, automobiles, semiconductors, metal processing, shipbuilding, etc.

In 2010, the graduate employment rate in the region was the lowest nationwide, at 88.9%.

Education
Major universities and colleges in Kyushu:
 National universities
 Kyushu University – One of seven former "Imperial Universities"
 Kyushu Institute of Technology
 Saga University
 Nagasaki University
 Kumamoto University
 Fukuoka University of Education
 Oita University
 Miyazaki University
 Kagoshima University
 National Institute of Fitness and Sports in Kanoya
 University of the Ryukyus
 Universities run by local governments
 University of Kitakyushu
 Kyushu Dental College
 Fukuoka Women's University
 Fukuoka Prefectural University
 Nagasaki Prefectural University
 Oita University of Nursing and Health Sciences
 Prefectural University of Kumamoto
 Miyazaki Municipal University
 Miyazaki Prefectural Nursing University
 Okinawa Prefectural University of Arts
 Major private universities
 Fukuoka University – University with the largest number of students in Kyushu
 Kumamoto Gakuen University
 Ritsumeikan Asia Pacific University
 Seinan Gakuin University
 Kyushu Sangyo University – Baseball team won the Japanese National Championship in 2005
 University of Occupational and Environmental Health
 Kurume University

Transportation

Kyushu is linked to the larger island of Honshu by the Kanmon Railway Tunnel, which carries the non-Shinkansen trains of the Kyushu Railway Company, and the newer Shin-Kanmon Tunnel carrying the San'yō Shinkansen. Railways on the island are operated by the Kyushu Railway Company and West Japan Railway Company, as well as a variety of smaller companies such as Amagi Railway and   Nishitetsu Railway. Kyushu is also known for its scenic train services, such as the Limited Express Yufuin no Mori and Limited Express Kawasemi Yamasemi.

The Kanmon Bridge and Kanmon Roadway Tunnel also connect the island with Honshu, allowing for vehicular transport between the two. The Kyushu Expressway spans the length of the island, linking the Higashikyushu Expressway and Ibusuki Skyline, connecting major cities such as Fukuoka and Kumamoto along the way. There are also many quiet country roads, including popular tourist routes such as the Nichinan coast road and the Aso Panorama Line in Kumamoto Prefecture. Bus services are available and cover 2,400 routes within Kyushu's cities, connecting many other destinations.

Several passenger and car ferry services connect both northern and southern Kyushu with main port cities on the main island of Honshu (Kobe, Osaka, Tokyo) and Shikoku.

See also

 Azumi people, an ancient group of people who inhabited parts of Northern Kyūshū
 Geography of Japan
 Group Kyushu
 Hoenn, a fictional region in the Pokémon franchise which is based on Kyushu
 Japanese archipelago
 Kanmonkyo Bridge, that connects Kyūshū with Honshū
 Kyushu National Museum
 Kyushu dialects, Hichiku dialect, Hōnichi dialect, and Kagoshima dialect
 List of regions in Japan
 Northern Kyushu, Southern Kyushu
 United States Fleet Activities Sasebo
 Western Army (Japan)

References

External links 
 
 
 

Kyushu region
Islands of Japan
Japanese archipelago